The 1986–87 NBA season was the Rockets' 20th season in the NBA and 16th season in the city of Houston. The Rockets entered the season as runner-ups in the 1986 NBA Finals, having lost to the Boston Celtics in six games.

In the playoffs, the Rockets defeated the Portland Trail Blazers in four games in the First Round before losing to the Seattle SuperSonics in six games in the Semifinals.

Draft picks

Roster

Regular season

Season standings

z – clinched division title
y – clinched division title
x – clinched playoff spot

Record vs. opponents

Game log

Regular season

|- align="center" bgcolor="#ccffcc"
| 1
| November 1, 1986
| L.A. Lakers
| W 112–102
|
|
|
| The Summit
| 1–0
|- align="center" bgcolor="#ffcccc"
| 6
| November 12, 1986
| @ Dallas
|- align="center" bgcolor="#ffcccc"
| 8
| November 18, 1986
| Portland
|- align="center" bgcolor="#ccffcc"
| 9
| November 20, 1986
| Utah
|- align="center" bgcolor="#ffcccc"
| 10
| November 21, 1986
| @ Washington
|- align="center" bgcolor="#ffcccc"
| 11
| November 23, 1986
| @ Philadelphia
|- align="center" bgcolor="#ccffcc"
| 13
| November 26, 1986
| @ Indiana

|- align="center" bgcolor="#ffcccc"
| 15
| December 2, 1986
| @ Golden State
| L 99–104
|
|
|
| Oakland-Alameda County Coliseum Arena
| 7–8
|- align="center" bgcolor="#ffcccc"
| 16
| December 4, 1986
| Atlanta
| L 93–109
|
|
|
| The Summit
| 7–9
|- align="center" bgcolor="#ffcccc"
| 17
| December 6, 1986
| Seattle
| L 80–136
|
|
|
| The Summit
| 7–10
|- align="center" bgcolor="#ffcccc"
| 19
| December 11, 1986
| Golden State
| L 104–111
|
|
|
| The Summit
| 8–11
|- align="center" bgcolor="#ffcccc"
| 22
| December 18, 1986
| @ Seattle
| L 100–114
|
|
|
| Seattle Center Coliseum
| 9–13
|- align="center" bgcolor="#ffcccc"
| 23
| December 19, 1986
| @ Portland
|- align="center" bgcolor="#ffcccc"
| 24
| December 21, 1986
| L.A. Lakers
| L 96–103
|
|
|
| The Summit
| 9–15
|- align="center" bgcolor="#ffcccc"
| 26
| December 26, 1986
| @ L.A. Lakers
| L 111–134
|
|
|
| The Forum
| 10–16
|- align="center" bgcolor="#ffcccc"
| 27
| December 27, 1986
| @ Utah

|- align="center" bgcolor="#ccffcc"
| 29
| January 2, 1987
| @ Denver
|- align="center" bgcolor="#ccffcc"
| 30
| January 3, 1987
| Seattle
| W 138–114
|
|
|
| The Summit
| 13–17
|- align="center" bgcolor="#ffcccc"
| 31
| January 6, 1987
| @ Golden State
| L 100–118
|
|
|
| Oakland-Alameda County Coliseum Arena
| 13–18
|- align="center" bgcolor="#ccffcc"
| 32
| January 8, 1987
| Indiana
|- align="center" bgcolor="#ccffcc"
| 33
| January 10, 1987
| Dallas
|- align="center" bgcolor="#ccffcc"
| 35
| January 15, 1987
| @ Chicago
|- align="center" bgcolor="#ccffcc"
| 36
| January 16, 1987
| @ Detroit
| W 112–106
|
|
|
| Pontiac Silverdome
| 18–18
|- align="center" bgcolor="#ffcccc"
| 37
| January 18, 1987
| @ Boston
| L 99–122
|
|
|
| Boston Garden
| 18–19
|- align="center" bgcolor="#ccffcc"
| 41
| January 24, 1987
| Washington
|- align="center" bgcolor="#ffcccc"
| 42
| January 27, 1987
| Utah
|- align="center" bgcolor="#ffcccc"
| 43
| January 29, 1987
| Milwaukee
| L 93–99
|
|
|
| The Summit
| 22–21

|- align="center" bgcolor="#ccffcc"
| 44
| February 1, 1987
| @ Atlanta
| W 106–104
|
|
|
| The Omni
| 23–21
|- align="center" bgcolor="#ffcccc"
| 45
| February 3, 1987
| Denver
|- align="center" bgcolor="#ccffcc"
| 46
| February 5, 1987
| Golden State
| W 120–110
|
|
|
| The Summit
| 24–22
|- align="center"
|colspan="9" bgcolor="#bbcaff"|All-Star Break
|- style="background:#cfc;"
|- bgcolor="#bbffbb"
|- align="center" bgcolor="#ffcccc"
| 49
| February 14, 1987
| @ Milwaukee
| L 101–116
|
|
|
| MECCA Arena
| 26–23
|- align="center" bgcolor="#ccffcc"
| 50
| February 16, 1987
| Dallas
|- align="center" bgcolor="#ffcccc"
| 51
| February 19, 1987
| Boston
| L 92–99
|
|
|
| The Summit
| 27–24
|- align="center" bgcolor="#ccffcc"
| 52
| February 21, 1987
| Utah
|- align="center" bgcolor="#ccffcc"
| 53
| February 23, 1987
| Denver
|- align="center" bgcolor="#ffcccc"
| 54
| February 24, 1987
| @ Denver
|- align="center" bgcolor="#ccffcc"
| 55
| February 26, 1987
| @ Utah

|- align="center" bgcolor="#ffcccc"
| 56
| March 1, 1987
| Philadelphia
|- align="center" bgcolor="#ffcccc"
| 59
| March 5, 1987
| @ Golden State
| L 96–105
|
|
|
| Oakland-Alameda County Coliseum Arena
| 32–27
|- align="center" bgcolor="#ffcccc"
| 60
| March 7, 1987
| @ Seattle
| L 115–118
|
|
|
| Seattle Center Coliseum
| 32–28
|- align="center" bgcolor="#ffcccc"
| 61
| March 8, 1987
| @ Portland
|- align="center" bgcolor="#ffcccc"
| 62
| March 10, 1987
| Seattle
| L 127–136 (2OT)
|
|
|
| The Summit
| 32–30
|- align="center" bgcolor="#ffcccc"
| 64
| March 14, 1987
| @ Dallas
|- align="center" bgcolor="#ccffcc"
| 65
| March 16, 1987
| Chicago
|- align="center" bgcolor="#ffcccc"
| 68
| March 21, 1987
| @ Utah
|- align="center" bgcolor="#ffcccc"
| 69
| March 23, 1987
| Detroit
| L 110–114
|
|
|
| The Summit
| 36–33
|- align="center" bgcolor="#ccffcc"
| 71
| March 26, 1987
| Portland
|- align="center" bgcolor="#ffcccc"
| 72
| March 28, 1987
| L.A. Lakers
| L 109–123
|
|
|
| The Summit
| 37–35
|- align="center" bgcolor="#ffcccc"
| 73
| March 31, 1987
| @ L.A. Lakers
| L 96–111
|
|
|
| The Forum
| 37–36

|- align="center" bgcolor="#ccffcc"
| 76
| April 6, 1987
| @ Portland
|- align="center" bgcolor="#ccffcc"
| 79
| April 11, 1987
| Denver
|- align="center" bgcolor="#ffcccc"
| 80
| April 15, 1987
| @ Dallas
|- align="center" bgcolor="#ccffcc"
| 81
| April 17, 1987
| Dallas
|- align="center" bgcolor="#ffcccc"
| 82
| April 18, 1987
| @ Denver

Playoffs

|- align="center" bgcolor="#ccffcc"
| 1
| April 24, 1987
| @ Portland
| W 125–115
| Olajuwon (30)
| Olajuwon (10)
| Leavell (10)
| Memorial Coliseum12,666
| 1–0
|- align="center" bgcolor="#ffcccc"
| 2
| April 26, 1987
| @ Portland
| L 98–111
| Leavell,Sampson (28)
| McCray (12)
| Leavell (8)
| Memorial Coliseum12,666
| 1–1
|- align="center" bgcolor="#ccffcc"
| 3
| April 28, 1987
| Portland
| W 117–108
| Olajuwon (35)
| Olajuwon (11)
| Leavell (13)
| The Summit16,279
| 2–1
|- align="center" bgcolor="#ccffcc"
| 4
| April 30, 1987
| Portland
| W 113–101
| Olajuwon (27)
| McCray,Sampson (10)
| Leavell (8)
| The Summit16,279
| 3–1
|-

|- align="center" bgcolor="#ffcccc"
| 1
| May 2, 1987
| Seattle
| L 106–111 (OT)
| Olajuwon (28)
| Olajuwon (16)
| McCray (8)
| The Summit16,279
| 0–1
|- align="center" bgcolor="#ffcccc"
| 2
| May 5, 1987
| Seattle
| L 97–99
| Olajuwon (27)
| Olajuwon,Sampson (13)
| Leavell,McCray (8)
| The Summit16,279
| 0–2
|- align="center" bgcolor="#ccffcc"
| 3
| May 7, 1987
| @ Seattle
| W 102–84
| Olajuwon (33)
| Olajuwon (11)
| Reid (9)
| Seattle Center Coliseum14,587
| 1–2
|- align="center" bgcolor="#ffcccc"
| 4 
| May 9, 1987
| @ Seattle 
| L 102–117
| McCray,Olajuwon (20)
| McCray (12)
| Leavell (5)
| Seattle Center Coliseum14,559
| 1–3
|- align="center" bgcolor="#ccffcc"
| 5
| May 12, 1987
| Seattle
| W 112–107
| Olajuwon (26)
| McCray (10)
| McCray (11)
| The Summit16,279
| 2–3
|- align="center" bgcolor="#ffcccc"
| 6
| May 14, 1987
| @ Seattle
| L 125–128 (2OT)
| Olajuwon (49)
| Olajuwon (25)
| Reid (12)
|Seattle Center Coliseum14,751
| 2–4
|-

Player statistics

Season

Playoffs

Awards and records
Akeem Olajuwon, All-NBA First Team
Akeem Olajuwon, NBA All-Defensive First Team
Rodney McCray, NBA All-Defensive Second Team

Transactions

References

See also
1986–87 NBA season

Houston Rockets seasons